The 2016 Canberra Raiders season is the 35th in the club's history. Coached by Ricky Stuart and captained by Jarrod Croker, the Raiders are currently competing in the NRL's 2016 Telstra Premiership. They also competed in the 2016 NRL Auckland Nines pre-season tournament.

Squad

Player transfers 
A † denotes that the transfer occurred during the 2016 season.

Fixtures

NRL Auckland Nines

The NRL Auckland Nines is a pre-season rugby league nines competition featuring all 16 NRL clubs. The 2016 competition was played over two days on 6 February and 7 February at Eden Park. The Raiders feature in the Piha pool and played the Dragons, Sharks and Titans.

Regular season

Finals

Ladder

Player statistics

Highest try scorers

Most goals

Most field goals

Highest point scorers

Representative

Domestic

International

Honours
The Raiders' club awards were announced during their awards night on 19 September.
 Mal Meninga Medal: Josh Hodgson and Josh Papalii
 NRL Coaches Award: Joseph Leilua and Jordan Rapana
 NRL Rookie of the Year: Clay Priest
 Fred Daly Clubman of the Year: Iosia Soliola
 NYC Player of the Year: Jack Williams
 NYC Coaches Award: Daniel Dole
 Gordon McLucas Junior Representative Player of the Year: Nick Cotric
 Geoff Caldwell Welfare and Education Award: Jack Hickson

References

Canberra Raiders seasons
Canberra Raiders season